Get Up and Die is the debut EP released by American heavy metal group The Mentors.

Get Up and Die was later repackaged as Valu Pack in 1987 along with a free 7" containing three tracks from a concert in San Francisco in 1983. In 2009, it was re-released on a single 12", with the original EP tracks on one side and the live tracks, plus a spoken track where El Duce talks about the Mentors' early years, on the B-side. The spoken track previously appeared on a CD re-release of the Live at the Whisky album in 2004.

The tracks from the EP were re-recorded in 1989, appearing on that year's Sex, Drugs and Rock 'n Roll album.

Track listing

Personnel
 El Duce — drums, lead vocals
 Sickie Wifebeater — guitar
 Dr. Heathen Scum — bass

1981 EPs
Mentors (band) albums